Slauson Boy 2 is the tenth mixtape by American rapper Nipsey Hussle, and the final commercial mixtape to be released during his lifetime. It was released on his thirty-first birthday, on August 15, 2016, as a free digital download via mixtape hosting websites. Production was primarily handled by Marz, Mike & Keys, and Tariq Beats among others. It features guest appearances from Bino Rideaux, Mozzy, Buddy, Cuzzy Capone, Dave East, G Perico, Kirko Bangz, Mitchy Slick, Snoop Dogg, Stacy Barthe, Young Dolph, Young Life and Young Thug. The album served as a sequel to his debut mixtape Slauson Boy Vol. 1. 

After Nipsey Hussle's death on March 31, 2019, the album reached Billboard charts, peaking at number 104 on the Billboard 200 and at number 28 on the Independent Albums.

Track listing

Charts

References

External links
Slauson Boy 2 Mixtape by Nipsey Hussle on Datpiff

Sequel albums
2016 mixtape albums
Nipsey Hussle albums
Albums produced by Jake One
Albums produced by DJ Khalil
Albums produced by 1500 or Nothin'
Albums produced by Mars (record producer)